Aksel Tatevosovich Vartanyan (born January 8, 1938) is a Soviet and Russian journalist, sports historian and native of Tbilisi.

Vartanyan graduated from the Historical-Philological Department of Tbilisi Pedagogical Institute. Since 1962 he has worked full-time as a school teacher.

Vartanyan is famous as journalist for the Football weekly and the newspaper Sport Express, researcher of archives and other written stock-piles that accumulated since the inception of domestic club football.

Bibliography
 History of USSR Championships 1936-1979 "Futbol" Moscow 1994-98
 Eduard Streltsov - criminal or victim? "Terra-sport", Moscow 2001
 Secret Archive "Sport-Express" (2001)
 Under the Red Banner of Sportintern (October 1, 2001)
 Eastern novel (October 15, 2001)
 Not so scary is demon (October 22, 2001)
 Difficult road to "Double-V" (October 29, 2001)
 Women for the defenders of republic (November 5, 2001)
 To Caesar - the Cesarean, to Kosarev - the Kosarean (November 12, 2001)
 Football, war and diplomacy (December 10, 2001)
 How we entered FIFA (December 17, 2001)
 Annals "Sport-Express" (2003-2017)

See also
 Soviet Top League

References

External links
 President of Armenia was petitioned to help the Armenian encyclopedia
 Interview with Vartanyan

Journalists from Tbilisi
1938 births
Russian male journalists
20th-century Russian historians
Soviet sports journalists
Russian sports journalists
Russian people of Armenian descent
Living people
20th-century Russian male writers